Othian is a Town near Gujranwala, Pakistan.

References 

Villages in Gujranwala District